Saratoga Dew (foaled 1989 in New York) is an American Thoroughbred Champion racehorse. Bred by Penny Chenery, owner of Secretariat, and raced by Charles F. Engel, in 1992 Saratoga Dew became the first New York-bred horse to win an Eclipse Award.

Trained by Gary Sciacca and ridden by Herb McCauley in her major races, en route to earning 1992 American Champion Three-Year-Old Filly honors, Saratoga Dew won eight times. In top level races she was second by a nose in the Alabama Stakes then scored wins in the Grade 1 Gazelle Handicap and Beldame Stakes and the Grade 2 Comely Stakes. Sent off as the parimutuel betting favorite in the 1992 Breeders' Cup Distaff at Florida's Gulfstream Park, Saratoga Dew had the lead by the half-mile mark but faded badly to finish twelfth in a fourteen-horse field.

Retired to broodmare duty, in 1996 Saratoga Dew was sent to stand at Shinkoh Farm in Japan.

References
 Saratoga Dew's pedigree and partial racing stats
 Video at YouTube of Saratoga Dew winning the 1992 Gazelle Handicap
 Photo of Saratoga Dew with jockey Herby McCauley aboard winning the 1992 Beldame Stakes

1989 racehorse births
Racehorses bred in New York (state)
Racehorses trained in the United States
Eclipse Award winners
Thoroughbred family 2-s